Pimba is a type of Portuguese music.

Pimba or PIMBA can also refer to:
Pimba, South Australia, a settlement in Australia
Pennsylvania Interscholastic Marching Band Association

People with the name
Gabriel Pimba (born 1990), Brazilian footballer